Luis Macedo is an American former fugitive on parole who was wanted for the murder of 15-year-old Alex Arellano in Chicago, Illinois. On May 1, 2009, Arellano was beaten, shot, and set on fire by Latin Kings gang members after refusing to show a gang sign. Macedo, a member of Latin Kings, is said to have started the attack. Macedo was federally charged with fleeing to avoid prosecution. According to authorities, he was said to be living in Mexico (where he was eventually apprehended) or the southeastern United States.

Recent events and capture
In 2016, Macedo was added to FBI Ten Most Wanted Fugitives list. He was captured on August 27, 2017 in Guadalajara, Jalisco, Mexico without incident.

Macedo was profiled on The Hunt with John Walsh episode '"Enemy Territory" which premiered October 15, 2017.

Notes

References

External links
LUIS MACEDO - FBI

1988 births
Date of birth uncertain
FBI Ten Most Wanted Fugitives
Fugitives
Gang members
Living people